James, Jim or Jimmy Sullivan may refer to:

Entertainment
 James Sullivan (drummer) (1981–2009), or The Rev, Avenged Sevenfold drummer
 Jim Sullivan (musician) (1940–1975?), American singer-songwriter who disappeared in New Mexico
 Big Jim Sullivan (1941–2012), English guitarist
 Jim Sullivan (writer) (born 1978), English comedy writer
 Jim Sullivan, sculptor of the Babe Ruth Home Run Award

Politics
 James Sullivan (governor) (1744–1808), governor of Massachusetts, 1807–08
 James Mark Sullivan (1873–1935), American lawyer and diplomat
 James Sullivan (city manager) (1925–2012), American city manager
 Jim Sullivan (Wisconsin politician) (born 1967), state senator for Wisconsin's 5th Senate district
 Jim Sullivan (Irish republican) (died 1992), member of the Official IRA in Belfast at time of outbreak of Northern Ireland troubles
 Jimmy Sullivan (politician), Australian politician

Sports
 James Edward Sullivan (1862–1914), American Olympic official
 James Sullivan (athlete) (1885–1965), American Olympic athlete in 1906 and 1908
 Jim Sullivan (boxer) (1886–1949), British boxer
 Jimmy Sullivan (footballer) (1896–1983), Victorian Football League player
 Jim Sullivan (rugby, born 1903) (1903–1977), Welsh rugby league player
 Jim Sullivan (Australian rugby league) (fl. 1950s), Australian rugby league player
 Jim Sullivan (footballer) (1904–1974), English association footballer
 Jim Sullivan (1920s pitcher) (1894–1972), Major League baseball pitcher, 1921–1923
 Jim Sullivan (1890s pitcher) (1867–1901), Major League baseball pitcher, 1891–1898
 Jim Sullivan (curler) (1968–2011), Canadian curler

Other
 James Sullivan (Medal of Honor) (1828–1918), American soldier, real name Peter Van Hoesen
 James F. Sullivan (1857–1917), American sailor and Medal of Honor recipient
 James W. Sullivan (1909–1974), American art director
 James Stephen Sullivan (1929–2006), American prelate of the Roman Catholic Church
 L. James Sullivan (born 1933), American firearms inventor
 James J. Sullivan, American lawyer specializing in occupational safety and health law
 James P. Sullivan, fictional protagonist of the Monsters Inc. franchise